New Town Killers is a British drama film written and directed by Richard Jobson, starring James Anthony Pearson and Dougray Scott. New Town Killers follows two business men, portrayed by Dougray Scott and Alastair Mackenzie, who play macabre cat and mouse games with people from the fringes of society.

The film was an official selection for both The Times BFI London Film Festival, 2008 and The International Thessaloniki Film Festival, 2008.

Plot
Two private bankers, Alistair (Scott) and Jamie (Mackenzie), who have the world at their feet get their kicks from playing a twelve-hour game of hunt, hide and seek with people from the margins of society. Their next target is Sean Macdonald (Pearson) a parentless teenager who lives with his sister on a housing estate on the outskirts of Edinburgh.

She's in debt, he's going nowhere fast. Sean agrees to play for cash. He soon realises he's walked into twelve hours of hell where survival is the name of the game.

Theme song
The theme song "New Town Killers" marked Richard Jobson's first official return to songwriting in over fifteen years. The song was co written with Scottish group Isa & the Filthy Tongues who include former members of Goodbye Mr Mackenzie and Angelfish. Jobson contributed the lyrics and the band created the music. The backing music for this song was also used as the introductory score for the film.

Jobson helped the band perform this song at the Edinburgh film festival launch of the movie in June 2009 at Edinburgh's Voodoo Rooms.

Cast
 Dougray Scott as Alistair Raskolnikov
 James Anthony Pearson as Sean Macdonald
 Alastair Mackenzie as Jamie Stewart
 Charles Mnene as Sam
 Shelley Conn as Julie Stewart
 Liz White as Alice Kelly
 Karen Gillan (in her first film role) as Young Girl in Bus Station

External links
 
 
 
 Review at Dvdtimes.com

2008 films
2008 psychological thriller films
Films set in Edinburgh
Films shot in Edinburgh
British psychological thriller films
2000s English-language films
2000s British films